Dom Casmurro is an 1899 novel written by Brazilian author Joaquim Maria Machado de Assis. Like The Posthumous Memoirs of Bras Cubas and Quincas Borba, both by Machado de Assis, it is widely regarded as a masterpiece of realist literature. It is written as a fictional memoir by a distrusting, jealous husband. The narrator, however, is not a reliable conveyor of the story as it is a dark comedy. Dom Casmurro is considered by critic Afranio Coutinho "a true Brazilian masterpiece, and maybe Brazil's greatest representative piece of writing" and "one of the best books ever written in the Portuguese language, if not the best one to date." The author is considered a master of Brazilian literature with a unique style of realism.

Adaptations
In 1998, Fernando Sabino published the novel Amor de Capitu. In this version, the narrative was rewritten in third person.

A comic book adaptation was made in 2012 by Mario Cau and Felipe Greco. This comic won the 2013 Prêmio Jabuti (the most traditional Brazilian literary award) in "best illustration" and "best school related book" categories

References

Sources
 Machado de Assis, Joaquim Maria Dom Casmurro (1953) Translated by Helen Caldwell. London: W. H. Allen.
 Salomon, Geanneti Tavares. 2021. Fashion and Irony in «Dom Casmurro». New York: Peter Lang.

External links

 MetaLibri Digital Library's Dom Casmurro

1899 Brazilian novels
adultery in novels
fiction with unreliable narrators
novels by Machado de Assis
Portuguese-language novels